Rohan Bopanna and Aisam-ul-Haq Qureshi were the defending champions, but they chose not to participate together.
Bopanna successfully defended the title alongside Daniel Nestor, defeating Qureshi and Nenad Zimonjić in the final, 6–4, 6–1.

Seeds

Draw

Draw

Qualifying

Seeds

Qualifiers
  Jamie Murray /  John Peers

Lucky losers
  Andrey Golubev /  Denis Istomin

Qualifying draw

References
 Main Draw

Dubai Tennis Championships - Doubles
2015 Men's Doubles